The Goodhope River is a stream,  long, on the Seward Peninsula in the U.S. state of Alaska. The entire course of the river lies within the Bering Land Bridge National Preserve.

The river name derives from "Goodhope Bay". Explorer Otto von Kotzebue assigned the name to the bay, which he visited in 1816, because he had good hope of making important geographic discoveries in the region. The river's Inupiat name was reported in 1998  as Pittam Kuurua.

See also
List of rivers of Alaska

References

Rivers of Northwest Arctic Borough, Alaska
Rivers of the Seward Peninsula
Drainage basins of the Chukchi Sea
Rivers of Alaska